The 2011 Horizon League Tournament will be the postseason tournament of the Horizon League to determine the Horizon League's champion and automatic berth into the 2011 NCAA Division I Men's Soccer Championship.

See also 
 Horizon League
 2011 Horizon League men's soccer season
 2011 in American soccer
 2011 NCAA Division I Men's Soccer Championship
 2011 NCAA Division I men's soccer season

References 

Horizon League